Tom Crouch may refer to:

 Tom D. Crouch (born 1944), American aeronautics historian and curator
 Tom Crouch (footballer) (1916–1990), Australian rules footballer